The Yakovlev Yak-130 (NATO reporting name: Mitten) is a subsonic two-seat advanced jet trainer and light combat aircraft originally developed by Yakovlev and Aermacchi as the "Yak/AEM-130". It has also been marketed as a potential light attack aircraft. Development of the aircraft began in 1991 and the maiden flight was conducted on 25 April 1996. In 2002, it won a Russian government tender for training aircraft and in 2010 the aircraft entered service with the Russian Air Force. As an advanced training aircraft, the Yak-130 is able to replicate the characteristics of several 4+ generation fighters as well as the fifth-generation Sukhoi Su-57.

Development

In the early 1990s, the Soviet government asked the industry to develop a new aircraft to replace the Czech-made Aero L-29 Delfín and Aero L-39 Albatros jet trainers. Five design bureaus put forward proposals. Among them were the Sukhoi S-54, Myasishchev M-200, Mikoyan MiG-AT, and Yakovlev Yak-UTS. In 1991, the other proposals were dropped and only the MiG-AT and Yak-UTS remained. The air forces of the newly independent Russia estimated that its requirement would be about 1,000 aircraft.

Development of Yak-UTS started in 1991 and the design was completed in September 1993. With the collapse of the Soviet Union, however, Yakovlev was compelled to look for a foreign partner. After having entered discussions in 1992, in 1993 it agreed with the Italian company Aermacchi to jointly develop the plane, which now became Yak/AEM-130; Aermacchi would be responsible for the project's financial and technical support. The first prototype, dubbed Yak-130D, was built by Sokol at Nizhny Novgorod, Russia, and was publicly unveiled in June 1995. The aircraft made its first flight on 25 April 1996 from Zhukovsky Airport at the hands of Yakovlev chief test pilot Andrey Sinitsyn.

In 2000, differences in priorities between the two firms had brought about an end to the partnership, with each developing the aircraft independently. The Italian version was named M-346; Yakovlev received US$77 million for technical documents of the aircraft. Yakovlev would be able to sell the aircraft to countries such those in the Commonwealth of Independent States, India, Slovakia and Algeria. Aermacchi would be able to sell to NATO countries, among others.

In March 2002, Commander-in-Chief Vladimir Mikhailov said that the Yak-130 and the MiG-AT had been chosen as the Russian Air Force's new trainers. The Yak-130, however, was said to be superior as it could serve the dual role of a trainer and combat jet. On 10 April 2002, it was announced that Yak-130 had been chosen as the winner of the tender for trainer aircraft for basic and advanced pilot training, beating the MiG-AT. By then, the Russian Air Force had ordered 10 Yak-130s, and the total cost of research and development, which included the construction and testing of the four pre-production aircraft, had amounted to some $200 million, 84% of which was financed by Yakovlev and the rest by the Russian government. However, it was reported that as much as $500 million had been spent in as early as 1996.

Plans to develop a light-attack aircraft based on the Yak-130 came to a halt in the late 2011. Dubbed Yak-131, the aircraft failed to meet critical pilot safety requirements put forward by the Russian Air Force. The air force had instead shifted focus to a replacement based on the Sukhoi Su-25.

Design

Yak-130 is an advanced pilot training aircraft, able to replicate characteristics of Russian 4th and 5th generation fighters. This is possible through the use of open architecture digital avionics compliant with a 1553 Databus, a full digital glass cockpit, four-channel digital Fly-By-Wire System (FBWS) and Instructor controlled and variable FBWS handling characteristics and embedded simulation. The type also has a Head-up display (HUD) and a Helmet-Mounted-Sighting-System (HMSS), with a double GPS/GLONASS receiver updating an Inertial Reference System (IRS) for highly accurate navigation and precision targeting. The developer estimates that the plane can cover up to 80% of the entire pilot flight training program.

In addition to its training role, the aircraft is capable of fulfilling Light Attack and Reconnaissance duties. According to its chief designer Konstantin Popovich, during a testing phase that ended in December 2009, the plane was tested with "all airborne weapons with a weight of up to 500 kg that are in service in the Russian Air Force". Yak-130 has nine hard points: two wingtip, six under-wing and one under-fuselage.

The aircraft's twin engines are mounted under extended wing roots, which reach as far forward as the windscreen. Two Ivchenko Progress AI-222-25 Full Authority Digital Engine Control (FADEC) produce a combined total of 49 kilonewtons (11,000 pound-force) of thrust. This compares with 0.65 for the BAE Systems Hawk 128 and 0.49 for the Aero Vodochody L-159B.

Maximum true airspeed is Mach 0.93 (572 knots), service ceiling is 12,500 metres (41,000 feet) and load factors are from −3 to +9 g.

The Yakovlev Yak-130 is equipped with the FBWS controlled engine intake blanking doors, in order to prevent the aircraft's engines from sustaining Foreign object damage when operating from unpaved runways and grass strips.

The large canopies are sideways hinged.

Combat training suite on the Yak-130 includes simulated and real firing systems with air-to-air and air-to-surface missiles, bomb dropping, gun firing and on-board self-protection systems.

Orders and deliveries

Firm orders

Russia
In 2005, the Russian Air Force passed its first order for 12 Yak-130s. The Russian Air Force intends to buy at least 72 Yak-130s, enough to equip four training regiments. Its Commander-in-Chief, Colonel General Aleksandr Zelin, announced on 8 November 2011 that the Russian Defence Ministry was to sign a contract within two weeks with Irkut Corporation for 65 additional aircraft – 55 firm orders plus 10 options. Zelin stated that deliveries were expected to be completed by 2017.

The first serial aircraft was handed to a training center in Lipetsk on 19 February 2010. Once the 2005 contract for 12 Sokol plant-made Yak-130s for the Russian Defence Ministry was fulfilled in June 2011, a decision was made that all subsequent Yak-130 orders, both domestic and export ones, would be handled by the Irkutsk Aviation Plant of the Irkut Corporation. However, the Russian Air Force only took delivery of the first Yak-130 built by the Irkutsk plant in October 2012.

In February 2014 Irkut Corporation revealed a contract with the Russian Ministry of Defense (MoD) to supply additional Yakovlev Yak-130 advanced jet trainers to the air force. According to Irkut president Oleg Demchenko, the company in December signed a contract with the Defense Ministry on the delivery of 12 Yak-130s to form a new aerobatics team. At the same time, a second contract for 10 more aircraft for the Russian Naval Aviation was signed.

Algeria
Algeria was the first export customer for the Yak-130, ordering 16 aircraft in March 2006. Their delivery started only a few months after the arrival of the first Yak-130s in the Russian Air Force, in 2011, and the order was completed the next year.

Bangladesh
In January 2014, Bangladesh ordered 24 Yak-130s. The aircraft are bought with an extended loan from Russia. Later the order has been reduced to 16 aircraft. The first batch of 6 aircraft was delivered on 20 September 2015. The second batch of five aircraft was delivered on 29 December 2015, while the next five were delivered by the first quarter of 2016.

Belarus
In December 2012, the Government of Belarus signed an agreement with Russia to provide four Yak-130s to Belarus by April 2015. Another order for four aircraft was passed in August 2015, and these were delivered in November 2016. A further four aircraft were delivered in 2019, bringing the total up to 12 aircraft. All were delivered to the 206th Flight Training Centre.

Laos
Laos ordered 10 Yak-130s in August 2017. Deliveries started in 2018.

Myanmar
Myanmar ordered six Yak-130s in June 2015. All six aircraft were delivered in December 2017. Six additional aircraft were ordered later. Following the 2021 coup, Myanmar received a further six jets which were revealed at the 74th anniversary ceremony of Myanmar’s Air Force.

Potential orders
In April 2012, Irkut Corporation president Alexey Fedorov claimed that there were "more than ten potential customers".

Argentina
In 2021 Russia offered the Argentine Air Force a batch of 15 MiG-29 fighters and another batch of 12 Su-30 fighters and seeks also the sale of Yak-130 training jet and Mil Mi-17 helicopters.

Bolivia
Bolivia considers the Yak-130 as a candidate for the replacement of its retired Lockheed T-33s.

Kazakhstan
Two rounds of negotiations with Russia regarding a potential order for Yak-130s took place in 2010 and 2012 respectively. No firm orders came out of it, but the Yak-130 may be bought to replace Kazakhstan's current Aero L-39C trainers, when they will run out of service life.

Malaysia
In November 2012, Sergey Kornev, a representative of Rosoboronexport (Russia's state intermediary agency for exports/imports of defense-related products), said Malaysia and several other countries were also interested in the Yak-130. He was speaking at the China Airshow at Zhuhai.

Uruguay
The Uruguayan Air Force is considering the aircraft for the future replacement of the A-37 with presumably used examples of the F-5 Freedom Fighter as another possible candidate.

Cancelled and non-implemented orders

Libya
Libya put an order for six planes. Deliveries were expected in 2011–2012, but the Libyan National Transitional Council cancelled the order for Yak-130s in September 2011 as part of a review of all existing arms contracts.

Syria
Syria has agreed to purchase 36 aircraft, but delivery of these has been postponed by Russia due to the conflict in Syria. In May 2014 Russia announced that it would supply Syria with Yakovlev Yak-130s. Syria was expected to receive nine aircraft by the end of 2014, 12 in 2015 and 15 in 2016, for a total of 36 airplanes. However, as of 2019, no deliveries had taken place.

Operational history

The first prototype, designated Yak-130D and registered as RA-43130, made its maiden flight on 25 April 1996 at Zhukovsky.

On 30 April 2004, the first pre-series Yak-130, assembled at the Sokol plant in Nizhny Novgorod, performed its maiden flight. The plane was put on display for the first time at the Paris Air Show in June 2005. It was followed by three more pre-series aircraft.

In December 2009, the aircraft completed state trials and was accepted for service in the Russian Air Force.

The Yak-130 has been used in combat in the internal conflict in Myanmar, at least since 2020. Its use has been criticised after verifiable evidence of military air strikes against civilians emerged online.

Accidents and incidents 

 26 June 2006: A Yak-130 prototype crashed in the Ryazan region. Both pilots ejected safely without injuries.
 29 May 2010: A preseries Yak-130 crashed at Lipetsk Air Base. The accident occurred during testing. Both pilots ejected; their condition was satisfactory. There were no casualties or injuries to people on the ground.
 15 April 2014: A Yak-130 crashed in the Astrakhan region, 25 km from Akhtubinsk near the village of Bataevka. Both pilots ejected, but one of them, Lt. Col. Sergei Seregin, was killed. The cause of the accident was a malfunction. The Yak-130 was owned by the 1080th Red Banner Aviation Centre for Retraining of Personnel named after V.P. Chkalov at Borisoglebsk. There were no casualties or damage to those on the ground.
 11 July 2017: A Bangladesh Air Force Yakovlev Yak-130 crashed at Lohagara in Bangladesh’s southeastern Chittagong District. Both pilots were unharmed.
 27 December 2017: Two Bangladesh Air Force Yakovlev Yak-130s crashed at Maheshkhali Island in Cox's Bazar due to a mid-air collision. The official report states that the accident happened during the breaking of formation at a training exercise. All four pilots were rescued alive.
 19 May 2021: A Belarusian Air Force Yakovlev Yak-130 crashed in Baranavichy, causing minor damage to one house in the city. Two pilots ejected but died.
 18 February 2022: Anti-Junta People's Defence Forces (PDFs) in Myanmar claimed they had damaged two Yak-130s at an air force base in Hmawbi.
 29 June 2022: A Myanmar air force Yak-130 is believed to have been damaged following a bird strike.

Variants

Yakovlev Yak-130D Yak-130 prototype.
Yakovlev Yak-130 Basic dual-seat advanced trainer.
Yakovlev Yak-131 Light attack aircraft, designed as a replacement for the Sukhoi Su-25. This version will have cockpit and engine armour, a GSh-30-1 autocannon, and either the Phazotron Kopyo radar with mechanical or electronic beam scanning, or the Tikhomirov NIIP Osa passive phased array radar 
Yakovlev Yak-133 Light Strike Aircraft for LUS. The project was canceled in the early 1990s.
Yakovlev Yak-133IB Fighter-bomber.
Yakovlev Yak-133PP Electronic countermeasure platform.
Yakovlev Yak-133R Tactical reconnaissance variant. 
Yakovlev Yak-135 Four-seat VIP transport.

Operators

 Algerian Air Force – 16 aircraft in service.

 Bangladesh Air Force – 13 aircraft in service. Among them 3 aircraft crashed.

 Belarusian Air Force – 12 aircraft in service. In June 2019, a contract was signed with Irkut Corporation to retrofit the Yak-130 aircraft for the installation of the Belarusian-made Talisman airborne defensive suite.

Lao People's Liberation Army Air Force – 10 aircraft on order, 4 in service.

 Myanmar Air Force – 18 aircraft in service. First contract was signed in 2015, first 3 aircraft of the contract were delivered in March 2017. Another 3 aircraft under the first contract were delivered in November 2017, increasing the total number of aircraft in service to 6. In February 2018, it was announced Myanmar will receive another batch of 6 aircraft under the second contract signed in December 2016, the aircraft were delivered in late 2018 and commissioned in December 2019. 6 aircraft commissioned in December 2021.
 
 Russian Air Force – Russia has a total requirement for about 200 aircraft. In 2009-2018, total 109 aircraft were delivered and put in service. A new contract signed in 2019 and the first 2 aircraft delivered in early 2020. 25 more ordered in August 2020.

 Vietnam People's Air Force – 12 aircraft on order have been delivered in 2022.

Specifications (Yak-130)

See also

References

Notes

Bibliography

 Butowski, Piotr. "Russian T-Bird". Air International, Vol. 83 No. 3, September 2012. pp. 92–95. .
 Gunston, Bill. Yakovlev Aircraft since 1924. London, UK: Putnam Aeronautical Books, 1997. .

External links

 A.S.Yakovlev designe bureau–Yak-130  and Training (combat-training) aircraft Yak-130 on Official website by Rosoboronexport

1990s Soviet and Russian military trainer aircraft
Yak-130
Twinjets
Aircraft first flown in 1996
Mid-wing aircraft
Fourth-generation jet fighter